Bulansaz (Bolanhaź) is a rural locality (a village) in Michurinsky Selsoviet, Sharansky District, Bashkortostan, Russia. The population was 104 as of 2010. There are 2 streets.

Geography 
Bulansaz is located 16 km northeast of Sharan (the district's administrative centre) by road. Michurinsk is the nearest rural locality.

References 

Rural localities in Sharansky District